Amanda Carreras (born 16 May 1990) is a British tennis player from Gibraltar.

Carreras has won 11 singles and 15 doubles titles on the ITF Circuit. On 24 April 2017, she reached her best singles ranking of world No. 236, and peaked at No. 279 in the doubles rankings.

Due to Carreras winning her first two singles and doubles titles back-to-back, the ITF website wrote a "Spotlight On…" article on Carreras in May 2009.

On 24 July 2012, Carreras carried the Olympic flame in the torch relay in Ealing, London. Nicola Bosio (another Gibraltarian athlete) passed on the flame to Amanda who was described as one of Gibraltar's finest sportswomen.

The three additional gold medals, she won at her home Island Games in 2019, pushed her total up to nine medals, eight of them gold, and made her the most decorated athlete in the history of the games. As well as this, she holds a 12–0 record in singles and has won half of all her singles matches without the loss of a single game, twice in 2011, and in all four of her matches in 2019.

With a total of 401 singles match-wins, Carreras is ranked fourth all time amongst female British tennis players, and second amongst active players for most single wins. As well as 353 of those wins being on clay, she has won more matches on the surface out of any British player, male or female. With this impressive feat it is surprising, she has never been nominated to play in a Fed Cup tie, especially given the GB is 0–3 in Fed Cup ties since Carreras professional debut back in 2008 and has a win/loss total of 4–9 on clay.

In addition, Carreras competed in the 2010 Commonwealth games held in Delhi where she reached the round of 16 in singles, after winning her opening-round match 6–0, 6–0 against Tiriata Keeba of Kiribati, but then lost to eventual fourth placer and sixth seed, Olivia Rogowska of Australia, 2–6, 4–6. Thus far, 2010 has been the only time tennis has ever been included in the games' program.

She has twice beaten Garbiñe Muguruza on the ITF Circuit, including back in May 2009 to win her first title in Ankara, Turkey with a score of 7–5, 7–5. Muguruza would later go on to become world No. 1 in 2017, and capture two Grand Slam titles at Roland Garros and Wimbledon.

Career

Junior career (2004–2008) 
Carreras only competed in a total of nine tournaments over the course of her junior career, reaching the quarterfinals in only one of them. As a doubles competitor she reached two semifinals and two quarterfinals. By July 2008, when she played in her last junior tournament, she had accumulated win–loss records of 8–9 in singles and 8–8 in doubles. Her career-high combined junior ranking was world No. 548 (achieved on 18 July 2005).

2006–2007
Carreras first competed on senior events in February 2006, but during the rest of the year she failed to pass the second round in any of her tournaments. She ended 2006 without a world ranking.

She continued competing on the ITF Women's Circuit in 2007 and reached her first ever quarterfinal as a qualifier in July at a $10k clay-court event in Tampere, Finland. In her very next tournament (also a $10k clay-court event), she again managed to qualify and this time she reached her very first ITF semifinal. She ended the 2007 season with a ranking of world No. 873.

2008
In March 2008, Carreras reached another ITF quarterfinal, this time in Antalya. In May, she reached her first ever ITF final in a $10k event in Tortosa where she was beaten by Beatriz García Vidagany. She reached the final in her very next tournament where she lost to Elitsa Kostova, in three sets. In August she reached another semifinal and in September and October she reached three more quarterfinals. In November, she again fell just short of winning a tournament when she lost in the final of a $10k event in El Menzah, Tunisia. Her ranking at the end of 2008 had risen almost 300 places to world No. 591.

2009
Carreras began her 2009 season on clay courts and reached another $10k semifinal in March. She followed this up by reaching the quarterfinals of her following tournament which was also a $10k event. Carreras continued competing on the ITF Circuit without any notable result until May, when she reached the semifinals of a $10k tournament in Badalona, Spain. She then headed to Antalya where she won both the singles and doubles in two consecutive events, giving her the first four ITF titles of her career and prompting the official ITF website to feature her in their "Spotlight On…" article for May. This momentum then carried her to another semifinal in her next tournament, when Nataša Zorić from Serbia ended her winning streak of 13 singles matches. Despite this promising first part of the year, Carreras did not pass the second round in any of her remaining tournaments in 2009 with the exception of one quarterfinal showing in late October and one runner-up position in another $10k clay-court event in late November. By the end of 2009, her singles ranking was world No. 423.

ITF Circuit finals

Singles: 24 (11 titles, 13 runner–ups)

Doubles: 26 (15 titles, 11 runner–ups)

References

External links

 
 

1990 births
Living people
People from Bicester
British female tennis players
Gibraltarian tennis players
Commonwealth Games tennis players for Gibraltar
Tennis players at the 2010 Commonwealth Games
Gibraltarian sportswomen
Commonwealth Games competitors for Gibraltar